2020 Ukrainian Athletics Indoor Championships among the athletes of the senior age category were held from 20 to 22 February in Sumy at the Athletics Indoor Arena of Sumy State University.

Yaroslava Mahuchikh jumped 2.01 m to win the national title.

Medalists

Men

Women

Live stream 
Ukrainian Athletics streamed all events live:

See also 
 2020 Ukrainian Athletics Championships

References

External links 
 Championships' web-page  on the Ukrainian Athletics's web-site 

Ukrainian Athletics Indoor Championships
Ukrainian Indoor Athletics Championships
Ukrainian Athletics Indoor Championships
Sport in Sumy